Gnap may refer to:

 Gnap!, the word used by Smurfs after being turned into The Black Smurfs
 Greg Norman Australian Prime, a meat export venture between Greg Norman and Australian Agricultural Company
 Dmytro Gnap (born 1977), Ukrainian journalist
 Markus Gnap, drummer of Disbelief
 The player character in the video game U.F.O.s

See also
Nap (disambiguation)
Napp (disambiguation)
Nappe (disambiguation)